The Star Boarder is a 1919 American silent comedy short written and directed by and starring Larry Semon. The film also stars Lucille Carlisle, and features Norma Shearer (in her film debut) in an uncredited role as a beauty pageant contestant. The film is extant and available online. The plot has a released prisoner desiring a return to prison and swapping places with an escapee.

Cast
Larry Semon
Lucille Carlisle
Frank Alexander
The Beauties Squad (including Norma Shearer)

References

External links 
 

1919 films
Vitagraph Studios short films
American black-and-white films
American silent short films
Films directed by Larry Semon
1919 comedy films
Silent American comedy films
1919 short films
American comedy short films
1910s American films